Dhruva-devi was the queen of the Gupta emperor Chandragupta II (r. c. 380 – c. 415 CE), who ruled in present-day northern India. She was the mother of his successor Kumaragupta I, and was most probably same as Dhruva-svamini, who has been mentioned as a queen of Chandragupta and the mother of prince Govindagupta in a clay seal inscription.

According to the Sanskrit play Devi-Chandraguptam, which is now partially lost, Dhruvadevi was originally a queen of Chandragupta's elder brother Ramagupta, who decided to surrender her to a Shaka enemy after being besieged. Chandragupta entered the enemy camp disguised as the queen, and killed the enemy. A reconstruction of the play, based on other literary and epigraphic evidence, suggests that Chandragupta later killed Ramagupta, and married Dhruva-devi. The historicity of this narrative is debated among modern historians, with some scholars dismissing it as a work of fiction.

In Gupta records 

The word "Dhruva" literally means unchangeable or constant, and is the Sanskrit name for the pole star. According to the Gupta records, Dhruva-devi was the mother of Chandragupta's successor Kumaragupta I. The Basarh clay seal of Govindagupta mentions Dhruva-svamini as a queen of Chandragupta, and the mother of Govindagupta. It is unlikely that Chandragupta had two different queens with similar names: it appears that Dhruvasvamini was most probably another name for Dhruvadevi, and that Govindagupta was a real brother of Kumaragupta.

In Devi-Chandraguptam 

According to the Sanskrit play Devi-Chandraguptam, which is now available only in form of some fragments, Dhruvadevi was originally a queen of Chandragupta's elder brother Ramagupta. Once, Ramagupta was besieged by a Shaka enemy, who demanded Dhruva-devi as part of a peace agreement. Ramagupta agreed to surrender Dhruva-devi to the enemy, but Chandragupta went to the enemy camp disguised as the queen, and killed the enemy. The rest of the story is not clear from the surviving fragments, but based on later literary and epigraphic references, it may be reconstructed as follows: Ramagupta's public image suffered as a result of his decision to surrender his wife to an enemy, while Chandragupta was regarded as a hero by the subjects. Ramagupta grew jealous of his brother, and tried to persecute him. Chandragupta feigned madness to escape his brother's enmity, but ultimately killed him, became the new king, and married Dhruva-devi.

The historicity of the Devi-Chandraguptam plot has been doubted by several modern historians. For example, according to historian D. C. Sircar, the only historical facts in the play are that Dhruvadevi was a queen of Chandragupta and that the Shakas held power in western India: everything else is the author's own imagination or "some current popular legends embellished by his imagination".

Several later texts and inscriptions allude to the events described in the play (see ), but these sources may be based on the play itself, and thus, cannot be conclusively regarded as evidence corroborating the play's historicity. Chandragupta and Dhruvadevi are known to be historical persons, and Ramagupta's existence is also believed to have been proved by the discovery of some inscriptions and coins attributed to him (see ). However, this does not necessarily confirm the historicity of the events described in Devichandraguptam.

References

Bibliography 

 
 
 
 
 
 

Gupta Empire
Indian empresses
Ancient queens consort
4th-century Indian people
5th-century Indian people
4th-century women
5th-century women
Ancient Indian women